W.A.K.O. World Championships 2007 in Belgrade were the joint 16th edition of the W.A.K.O. world championships - the second event would be held later that year in Coimbra, Portugal.  They were for amateur male and female kickboxers and covered the following categories; K-1, Low-Kick and Light-Contact.  Weight classes for men ranged from light bantamweight (51 kg or 112 lb) to super heavyweight (over 91 kg or 200.6 lb), while the women's ranged from featherweight (52 kg or 114.6 lb) to super heavyweight (over 70 kg or 154 lb).  More information on the categories, weight classes and rules is provided in the various sections below.  In total there were 1085 athletes at the championships, representing sixty countries including China (taking part for the first time), fighting in 49 tournaments.  The Belgrade championships were held at the Pionir Hall in Belgrade, Serbia from Monday, September 24 to Monday, October 1, 2007.

K-1

W.A.K.O.'s K-1 category uses the same rules set by the K-1 organization and combine a mixture of techniques from Muay Thai, Karate, western boxing and other forms of stand up fighting.  The main difference between K-1 rules and other forms of kickboxing is the use of the clinch and knees – which have recently been limited to one knee per clinch.   Attacks that are legal include strikes to the head (front, side and forehead), the torso (front and side), leg (any part) and foot/feet (sweeps only).  As mentioned before fighters are also allowed to knees (only one hand to clinch and one knee strike per clinch) and can use the back fist/spinning back fist technique.  Strikes that are illegal include attacks to the top of the head, the back, the top of the shoulders, the neck and shots to the groin.  Techniques involving elbows are also illegal.  Due to the amateur nature of W.A.K.O. championships all fighters must wear protection for their head, teeth, breast (women only) groin, shin and feet, and must fight with the standard  gloves.   

Each fight is three, two-minute rounds and is scored by three judges who score successful (legal) strikes that are not blocked, and are thrown with full power.  As with other forms, illegal strikes may result in a point(s) deduction or even disqualification.  Unlike Full-Contact and Low-Kick it is not necessary for the minimum six kicks per round to be counte.  Victory can be achieved by a point's decision, technical knockout or knockout, abandonment (when one fighter gives up), disqualification or by a walkover (other fighter is unable to participate).  If a fighter is knocked down three times in the fight he will automatically lose via technical knockout. More detail on K-1 rules can be found at the official W.A.K.O. website.

Weight classes in K-1 at Belgrade were similar to that of the Low-Kick category, with the men having eleven weight classes from bantamweight (54 kg or 118.8 lb) to super heavyweight (over 90 kg or 200.2 lb), while the women's had six beginning at featherweight (52 kg or 114.4 lb) and ending super heavyweight (over 70 kg or 154 lb).  Belarus was the most successful nation in K-1 winning five gold, three silver and five bronze in both the male and female categories.

K-1 (Men) Medals Table

K-1 (Women) Medals Table

Low-Kick

Low-Kick is similar to Full-Contact kickboxing only that as well as allowing kicks and punches to the head and body, it also allows clean kicks to be made to opponents legs.  Attacks that are legal include strikes to the head (front, side and forehead), the torso (front and side), leg (thigh) and foot/feet (sweeps only).  Strikes that are illegal include attacks to the top of the head, the back, the top of the shoulders, the neck and the groin.  All fighters are required to wear protection for their head, teeth, breast (women only) groin, shin and feet, and must fight with the standard  gloves.

A minimum of six kicks must be thrown each round or points may be deducted by the referee.  Each fight is three, two minute rounds and is scored by three judges.  The judges will score successful (legal) strikes that are not blocked, and are thrown with full power.  Illegal moves may result in points deduction or if repeated, disqualification.  In the event of a draw after three rounds the judges will base the victor on who was stronger in the final round, or failing that will use their remarks from each round to deduce who wins.  Victory can be achieved by a point's decision, technical knockout or knockout, abandonment (when one fighter gives up), disqualification or by a walkover (other fighter is unable to participate).  If a fighter is knocked down three times in the fight he will automatically lose via technical knockout.  More detail on Low-Kick rules can be found at the official W.A.K.O. website.

At Belgrade the men's Low-Kick competition had twelve six weight classes starting at light bantamweight (51 kg or 112.2 lb) to super heavyweight (over 91 kg or 200.2 lb), while the women's had six ranging from featherweight (52 kg or 114.4 lb) to super heavyweight (over 70 kg or 154 lb), while .  As with Light-Contact, by the championships end, Russia was the strongest nation, having won an impressive haul of six gold, two silver and two bronze medals.

Low-Kick (Men) Medals Table

Low-Kick (Women) Medals Table

Light-Contact

In this form of kickboxing fighters are scored on their ability to land controlled and clean strikes with an emphasis put on style over power.  Fighters that fight too aggressively may be cautioned by the referee and, if the offence is repeated, may be disqualified, although strikes that are too light (such as a push or brush) will not be scored either.  Attacks are allowed to the head (front, side and forehead), the torso (front and side) and leg (foot sweeps).  As mentioned before excessive force is illegal as well as strikes to the top of the head, the back, the top of the shoulders, the neck and below the belt.  Light-Contact is seen as the intermediate stage between Semi and Full-Contact kickboxing involving more physicality than Semi but less so than Full.  All fighters are required to wear protection for their head, teeth, breast (women only) groin, shin and feet, and must fight with the standard 10oz gloves.

Fighters score the following points for landing a controlled strike on their opponent; punch, kick to body, foot sweep (1 point), kick to head, jumping kick to body (2 points), jumping kick to head (3 points).  Each fight is three, two-minute rounds and is scored by three judges.  In the event of a draw the match will be scored electronically.  Victory can be achieved by points decision, technical knockout (usually when one fighter is so dominant the referee is forced to stop the contest), abandonment (when one fighter gives up), disqualification or by a walkover (other fighter is unable to participate).  More detail on Light-Contact rules  can be found at the official W.A.K.O. website.

Light-Contact uses slightly different weight classes from Low-Kick and K-1.  At Belgrade the men had nine weight classes, starting at 57 kg or 125.4 lb and ending at over 94 kg (206.8 lb), while the women's Light-Contact competition had five weight classes beginning at 55 kg (121 lb) and ending at over 70 kg (154 lb).  At the end of the championships, Russia was the most successful nation in Light-Contact having won five gold and two silver medals.

Light-Contact (Men) Medals Table

Light-Contact (Women) Medals Table

Overall Medals Standing (Top 5)

The nation that came out on top at the W.A.K.O. Amateur World Championships 2007 in Belgrade were Russia who amassed fourteen gold, ten silvers and ten bronze medals in all categories, both male and female.

See also
List of WAKO Amateur World Championships
List of WAKO Amateur European Championships

References

External links
 WAKO World Association of Kickboxing Organizations Official Site

WAKO Amateur World Championships events
2007 in kickboxing
Kickboxing in Serbia
2007 in Serbian sport